Tetratheca nephelioides is a species of plant in the quandong family that is endemic to Australia.

Description
The species grows as a small, erect, clumped shrub to 40 cm in height and 80 cm wide. The deep mauve to magenta flowers appear in September.

Distribution and habitat
The range of the species lies within the Geraldton Sandplains IBRA bioregion of south-west Western Australia, some 240 km north of the city of Perth near the town of Eneabba. The plants grow on sandy, clayey, gravelly and lateritic soils.

Conservation
The species has been listed as Critically Endangered under Australia's EPBC Act. Threats include disturbance from power line and firebreak maintenance activities.

References

nephelioides
Eudicots of Western Australia
Oxalidales of Australia
Plants described in 2007